Heightington is a small village in Worcestershire, England.

It lies a little to the south-west of Bewdley and a little to the west of Stourport-on-Severn. Its best known landmark is the 13th century Grade II* listed St Giles' Church.

References

Villages in Worcestershire